Antique Antics is a 1933 short animated film by Columbia Pictures, featuring Krazy Kat.

Summary
The film begins just outside an antique shop, and a piece of Beethoven's Moonlight Sonata is played. Inside the shop, Krazy Kat, who operates the place, is having a little trouble walking around the ornaments. He lights a candle, and makes it safely to his bedroom.

While Krazy is asleep, the ornaments in the shop, particularly the statues, come to life, and march to the melody of Schubert's Three Marches Militaires which is played. The statues represent historical people like Theodore Roosevelt, Napoleon, and various. They then put up a party where they drink ale from casks, dance, and sing Auld Lang Syne. Their party is so audible that Krazy eventually wakes up and goes to investigate.

Several cartoons involve a theme where the shop's owner leaves, and the props come to life and party. The props would return to their quiet state if they knew the owner is coming back. But in the case of Antique Antics, Krazy gets to join the party, and the statues don't seem to mind. The film concludes with Krazy getting himself a mug of ale.

See also
 Krazy Kat filmography

References

External links
Antique Antics at the Big Cartoon Database

1933 short films
American animated short films
American black-and-white films
1933 animated films
Krazy Kat shorts
Columbia Pictures short films
1930s American animated films
Columbia Pictures animated short films
Screen Gems short films